Lalabad-e Kol Kol-e Yek (also Romanized as La‘lābād-e Kol Kol-e Yek) is a village in Mahidasht Rural District, Mahidasht District, Kermanshah County, Kermanshah Province, Iran. At the 2006 census, its population was 117, in 22 families.

References 

Populated places in Kermanshah County